Lowell William Tew (January 2, 1927 – March 1981) was an American football fullback in the All-America Football Conference for the New York Yankees.  He played college football at the University of Alabama and was drafted in the first round (fourth overall) of the 1948 NFL Draft.

1927 births
1981 deaths
People from Waynesboro, Mississippi
American football fullbacks
Alabama Crimson Tide football players
New York Yankees (AAFC) players